Franklin Clovis Anzité Touadéré (born 2 November 1985) is a Central African professional footballer who plays as centre-back.

Club career
Anzité did not make an appearance for Swindon Town's first team but played in several positions in the club's reserve team. Anzité was released by manager Maurice Malpas after he publicly stated that he and two other Portuguese players were brought by the previous club owners. He signed with Football Conference side Weymouth prior to being released at the end of the season. He played the 2009–10 season for Martigues and joined S.League club Étoile in January 2011.

Personal life
Anzité holds dual citizenship of the Central African Republic and France.

References

External links 

 

1985 births
Living people
Association football defenders
Association football midfielders
Central African Republic footballers
People from Bangui
Central African Republic international footballers
Weymouth F.C. players
Singapore Premier League players
Home United FC players
Franklin Anzite
Franklin Anzite
V.League 1 players
Hoang Anh Gia Lai FC players
Malaysia Premier League players
UiTM FC players
Liga 1 (Indonesia) players
PS TIRA players
Central African Republic expatriate footballers
Central African Republic expatriate sportspeople in the United Kingdom
Expatriate footballers in England
Central African Republic expatriate sportspeople in Singapore
Expatriate footballers in Singapore
Central African Republic expatriate sportspeople in Thailand
Expatriate footballers in Thailand
Central African Republic expatriate sportspeople in Vietnam
Expatriate footballers in Vietnam
Central African Republic expatriate sportspeople in Malaysia
Expatriate footballers in Malaysia
Central African Republic expatriate sportspeople in Indonesia
Expatriate footballers in Indonesia
Central African Republic emigrants to France
Naturalized citizens of France
French footballers
French sportspeople of Central African Republic descent
Ligue 1 players
Ligue 2 players
AC Ajaccio players
FC Libourne players
FC Martigues players
Étoile FC players